Adam Arnold (born April 5, 1981) is an American comic book creator. His works include the OEL manga/webcomic Aoi House and the supernatural comedy series spinoffs Vampire Cheerleaders and Paranormal Mystery Squad.

Career
Arnold started his career by co-creating the long-running monthly Internet webzine Animefringe: Online Anime Magazine in 1999, which he managed until it concluded its run in December 2005. Arnold has also contributed articles and reviews to print magazines such as Request Magazine, ToyFare, and Anime Insider.

In 2002, Arnold began working freelance for Tokyopop performing English adaptation work on such manga titles as Love Hina, A.I. Love You, G Gundam, Pita-Ten, and others. In September 2004, Arnold began working for manga publisher Seven Seas Entertainment as their webmaster and would later become senior production manager in charge of their manga line. To date, Arnold has edited over two hundred of Seven Seas Entertainment's releases.

In late 2004, Arnold came up with his webcomic Aoi House, which debuted on Seven Seas Entertainment's website, Gomanga.com, in 2005 and follows the trials and tribulations of two down-on-their-luck college guys named Alex and Sandy who join an anime club dominated by crazed yaoi fangirl. The original 36-episode version ran from January 24, 2005 to April 15, 2005 and was written by Arnold and illustrated by Jim Jimenez. On May 23, 2005, Aoi House was relaunched from the beginning with Shiei, artist of Amazing Agent Luna, taking over as illustrator. Aoi House would go on to run for four years until the series conclusion on January 31, 2009. A series of Aoi House 4-Koma strips also ran in Newtype USA from January 2006 to December 2007. 
Both the main Aoi House series and the 4-Koma strips have since been collected across four volumes of OEL manga and two omnibus editions.

Arnold is currently working on two supernatural comedy series entitled Vampire Cheerleaders and Paranormal Mystery Squad. The first volume is set to be released on March 15, 2011.

Acclaim
IGN's A. E. Sparrow ranked the first and second volumes of Aoi House as third in the list of the top ten manga of 2006.

Vampire Cheerleaders Vol. 2 debuted at No. 7 on The New York Times Manga Best Sellers list for the week of January 1, 2012.

Vampire Cheerleaders/Paranormal Mystery Squad Monster Mash Collection debuted at No. 9 on The New York Times Manga Best Sellers list for the week of June 24, 2012.

Works

Graphic novels
Aoi House Vol. 1. . Seven Seas Entertainment, 2006
Aoi House Vol. 2. . Seven Seas Entertainment, 2006
Aoi House In Love! Vol. 1. . Seven Seas Entertainment, 2007
Aoi House In Love! Vol. 2. . Seven Seas Entertainment, 2008
Aoi House Omnibus Collection I. . Seven Seas Entertainment, 2008
Aoi House Omnibus Collection II. . Seven Seas Entertainment, 2008
Vampire Cheerleaders Vol. 1. . Seven Seas Entertainment, 2011
Vampire Cheerleaders Vol. 2. . Seven Seas Entertainment, 2011
Vampire Cheerleaders/Paranormal Mystery Squad Monster Mash Collection. . Seven Seas Entertainment, 2012
Vampire Cheerleaders Must Die!. . Seven Seas Entertainment, 2013
Vampire Cheerleaders in Space...and Time?!. . Seven Seas Entertainment, 2015

Selected short stories and minicomics
 "Aoi House 4-Koma," (originally printed in Newtype USA January 2006 – December 2007)

References

External links

 AdamArnold.net
 

American webcomic creators
Living people
1981 births
21st-century American male artists
American editors